Historical ports may be found where ancient civilizations have developed maritime trade.

One of the world's oldest known artificial harbors is at Wadi al-Jarf on the Red Sea. Along with the finding of harbor structures, ancient anchors have also been found.

Ancient China

Guangzhou was an important port during the ancient times as far back as the Qin Dynasty.

Ancient Egypt

Canopus was the principal port in Egypt for Greek trade before the foundation of Alexandria.

Ancient Greece

Athens' port of Piraeus was the base for the Athenian fleet and this played a crucial role in the Battle of Salamis against the Achaemenid Empire in 480 BC.

Ancient India
Port of Chittagong (located in Bangladesh) has been a recorded seaport since the 4th century BCE. In the 2nd century, the harbor appeared on Ptolemy's map, drawn by the Claudius Ptolemy. The map mentions the harbor as one of the finest in the Eastern world. The Periplus of the Erythraean Sea documents trade between Chittagong and private merchants from Roman Egypt.

Lothal is one of the most prominent cities of the ancient Indus valley civilisation, located in the Bhāl region of the modern state of Gujarat. Lothal was one of the southern most cities of the Indus Valley Civilization. The port was constructed around 2200 BCE and is believed to be world's earliest known dock.

Ancient Rome

Ostia Antica was the port of ancient Rome with Portus established by Claudius and enlarged by Trajan to supplement the nearby port of Ostia.

Messina, sited on the Strait of Messina, also has a history as an ancient port.

East Africa
In East Africa, Post-classical Swahili kingdoms are known to have had trade port islands and trade routes with the Islamic world and Asia. They were described by Greek historians as "metropolises". Famous East African trade ports such as Mombasa, Zanzibar, Mogadishu and Kilwa were known to Chinese sailors such as Zheng He and medieval Islamic historians such as the Berber Islamic voyager Abu Abdullah ibn Battuta.

Japan 

During the Edo period, the island of Dejima was the only port open for trade with Europe and only received the Portuguese and Dutch traders,due to their historical relations, whereas Osaka was the largest domestic port and the main trade hub for rice.

See also
Ports
Ancient History
Ancient Ports

References

Further reading

 Hein, Carola; Schubert, Dirk. "Resilience, Disaster, and Rebuilding in Modern Port Cities." Journal of Urban History (Mar 2021) 47#2 pp 235-249.

Ancient history
Maritime history
Historical